Pseudopothyne is a genus of beetles in the family Cerambycidae, containing the following species:

 Pseudopothyne luzonica Breuning, 1960
 Pseudopothyne multivittipennis Breuning, 1960

References

Agapanthiini